Euleia marmorea is a species of tephritid or fruit flies in the genus Euleia of the family Tephritidae.

References

External links

marmorea
Insects described in 1805
Taxa named by Johan Christian Fabricius